Bouchercon is an annual convention of creators and devotees of mystery and detective fiction. It is named in honour of writer, reviewer, and editor Anthony Boucher; also the inspiration for the Anthony Awards, which have been issued at the convention since 1986. This page details Bouchercon XLIII and the 27th Anthony Awards ceremony.

Bouchercon
The convention was held in the Renaissance Cleveland Hotel of Cleveland, Ohio, on October 4, 2012; running until the 7th. The event was chaired by readers advisory librarian Marjory Mogg.

Anthony Awards
The following list details the awards distributed at the twenty-fifth annual Anthony Awards ceremony.

Novel award
Winner:
Louise Penny, A Trick of the Light
 
Shortlist:
Megan Abbott, The End of Everything
Reed Farrel Coleman, Hurt Machine
Michael Connelly, The Drop
Julia Spencer-Fleming, One Was a Soldier

First novel award
Winner:
Sara J. Henry, Learning to Swim

Shortlist:
Darrell James, Nazareth Child
Rochelle Staab, Who Do, Voodoo?
Taylor Stevens, The Informationist
Steve Ulfelder, Purgatory Chasm
S.J. Watson, Before I Go to Sleep

Paperback original award
Winner:
Julie Hyzy, Buffalo West Wing

Shortlist:
Robert Jackson Bennett, The Company Man
Christa Faust, Choke Hold
Michael Stanley, Death of the Mantis
Duane Swierczynski, Fun & Games
Frank Tallis, Vienna Twilight

Short story award
Winner:
Dana Cameron, "Disarming" from  Ellery Queen's Mystery Magazine, June 2011

Shortlist:
Ace Atkins, "The Case of Death and Honey", from A Study In Sherlock
Daryl Wood Gerber, "Palace on the Lake", from Fish Tales: The Guppy Anthology
Barb Goffman, "Truth and Consequences", from Mystery Times Ten
Roberta Isleib, "The Itinerary", from MWA Presents The Rich and The Dead
Twist Phelan, "Happine$$", from MWA Presents The Rich and The Dead

Critical / Non-fiction award
Winner:
Charlaine Harris, The Sookie Stackhouse Companion

Shortlist:
Leslie Budewitz, Books, Crooks and Counselors: How to Write Accurately About Criminal Law and Courtroom Procedure
John Curran, Agatha Christie: Murder in the Making: More Stories and Secrets from Her Notebooks
Michael Dirda, On Conan Doyle; or, The Whole Art of Storytelling
Philippa Gates, Detecting Women: Gender and the Hollywood Detective Film

References

External links

Anthony Awards
43
2012 in Ohio
Culture of Cleveland